B. Kodur is a village in Kadapa district of the Indian state of Andhra Pradesh. It is located B Kodur mandal of Badvel revenue division.

References 

Villages in Kadapa district